Donna Harun (born February 21, 1968) is an Indonesian actress and model of Dutch-Indonesian descent. She is the mother of actor Ricky Harun and mother-in-law of the actress and model Herfiza Novianti.

Career
Harun began her career as a model and then entered the world of entertainment. Her first film was Asmara in 1992. She participated on albums with Donna Arsinta and Novia Kolopaking. She worked on the Mamamia Show in Season 3 in 2010.

In 2011, she starred in the musical drama film Langit Biru with Ratnakanya Annisa Pinandita and her son, Jeje Soekarno. That same year, she also appeared in the soap opera Go Go Girls, with 7icons' member Dion Wiyoko, Billy Chong, and Cinta Dewi.

In 2012, she starred the sitcom soap opera Kampung Hawa, with Shareefa Danish and Epy Kusnandar on Trans7. She won "Best Female Leading Role" at the 2012 Festival Film Bandung.

Personal life
She was born Donna Frederika Rubyanti on February 21, 1968, in Bandung. She is the younger sister of the model Regina Ursula Shandi. She is divorced from Ardy Gustav and they have one son, Ricky Harun, who works as an actor and model.

In 1996, she married Hendra Rahtomo, who is the grandson of the first President of Indonesia, Soekarno. They have one son named Jeje Soekarno, who is also an actor.

Filmography

Film

Soap Opera
 Tiga Orang Perempuan
 Perkawinan Sedarah
 Indahnya KaruniaMu
 Ajang Ajeng
 Pink
 Damai Dihatimu
 Jangan Ada Dusta Diantara Kita
 Sahabat Sejati
 Cinta Tanpa Logika
 Akibat Pengaulan Bebas
 Dendam Membara
 Safa dan Marwah
 Alisa
 Kampung Hawa
 Angel's Diary Season 2
 Go Go Girls
 Dia atau Diriku
 Mimo Ketemu Poscha
 Cahaya Gemilang

Film Television
 Jangan Pasung Aku
 Dia Tetap Ibuku
 Aku Diperbudak Ibu Tiriku
 Jejak Berdarah
 Kejamnya Anak Kandung Mulianya Anak Tiri
 Aku Tak Secantik Ibuku
 Terimalah Taubat Ibu Ya Allah

Video Clip

References

External links
 

1968 births
Living people
People from Bandung
Sundanese people
Indonesian actresses
Indonesian female models